In Greek mythology, Syceus (Ancient Greek: , Sykeus, from  meaning "fig-tree") was a Titan son of Gaea (Earth) and eponym of the city of Sykea in Cilicia.

Mythology 
Only Athenaeus in his Deipnosophistae mentioned Sykeus' myth with his source being Tryphon's History of Plants and Androtion's Farmers' Handbook:

Sykeus, one of the Titans, was pursued by Zeus and taken under the protection of his mother, Earth, and that she caused the plant to grow for her son's pleasure.

See also 
 Daphne
 Pitys
 Myrrha
 Lilaeus

Notes

References 
 Athenaeus of Naucratis, The Deipnosophists or Banquet of the Learned. London. Henry G. Bohn, York Street, Covent Garden. 1854. Online version at the Perseus Digital Library.
 Athenaeus of Naucratis, Deipnosophistae. Kaibel. In Aedibus B.G. Teubneri. Lipsiae. 1887. Greek text available at the Perseus Digital Library.

Titans (mythology)
Children of Gaia
Metamorphoses into trees in Greek mythology
Greek gods
Deeds of Zeus